This is the filmography of Hong Kong actor, film director, producer and action choreographer Donnie Yen.

Film

Television

References

Yen, Donnie
 
Donnie Yen
Male actor filmographies